Hepet is a river village in Homalin Township, Hkamti District, in the Sagaing Region of northwestern Burma. It is located east of Gyobin.

References

External links
Maplandia World Gazetteer

Populated places in Hkamti District
Homalin Township